Nikolai Alekseev may refer to:
Nikolai Alekseev (Catholic priest) (1869–1952), Russian Greek-Catholic priest
Nikolay Alexeyev (born 1977), Russian gay-rights activist
Nikolay Alekseyev (mayor of Moscow) (1852–1893), Russian entrepreneur, philanthropist, and public figure
 (b. 1956), Russian conductor